The Jinan Olympic Sports Centre Stadium (Simplified Chinese: 济南奥林匹克体育中心),  also colloquially known as Xiliu is a multi-use stadium in the Jinan Olympic Sports Center in Jinan, China. The stadium was the main venue for the 2009 National Games of China in October 2009 and was used for the opening ceremony, football matches and athletics events. The stadium has a capacity for 56,808 spectators with a construction area of 131,000 square metres and was opened in April 2009.

References

External links 
World Stadium profile 

Sports venues in Shandong
Football venues in China
Multi-purpose stadiums in China
Tourist attractions in Jinan
Sports venues completed in 2009